Janner is a surname. Notable people with the surname include:

 Barnett Janner (1892–1982), British politician
 Ferdinand Janner (1836–1895), German theologian
 Greville Janner (1928–2015), British politician, barrister, and writer
 Laura Janner-Klausner (born 1963), British rabbi